M City Condos, owned by Rogers Real Estate Development (“Rogers”) and developed by Urban Capital is a master-planned community located at Burnhamthorpe Rd West and Confederation Parkway in Mississauga, Ontario, Canada. 

Construction on the community started in 2018, and Rogers and Urban Capital have launched five towers since.

The eight-tower, 15-acre, 4.3 million square foot mixed-use community will include condos, retail, office, green space, community amenities and two acres of public parkland.

The Towers

Tower One - M1 
M City launched its first tower, M1, in 2017. The 62-storey tower has an unconventional design with floor plates skewing and stacking in a repetitive pattern. Various amenities are available to residents, including a chef’s kitchen, dining room, lounges, a kids’ play zone, a fitness centre, a rooftop pool and the Greater Toronto Area’s first rooftop skating rink. The tower is due for completion in Q1 2023.

Tower Two - M2 
M2 was launched in tandem with M1as its twin building. The 62-storey tower includes townhomes at street level with condos above. Like M1, M2’s architecture features skewing and stacking floor plates and several amenity spaces, including a movie theatre and sports bar.

Tower Three - M3 
Plans for M3 were officially unveiled by Rogers, Urban Capital, and Mayor Bonnie Crombie on September 24th, 2018. M3 will be Mississauga’s tallest tower at 81-storeys and the condominium will have 949 units when complete. The building features a 6-storey podium, a 7-level underground residential parking garage, and balconies in every suite.

M3’s indoor and outdoor amenities include a fitness centre, an indoor salt-water infinity pool with an outdoor sundeck, an outdoor living room with a TV, a private dining room and kitchen, a screening room, private event space, as well as a kids’ playground, splash pad, and games area.

Tower Four - M4 
Launched in 2021, M4 is one of Canada’s most technologically advanced condominiums. Every suite comes with Rogers Ignite Internet Gigabit and an advanced fibre-powered network which provides residents with wall-to-wall WiFi throughout the building, both indoors and outdoors. M4’s Distributed Antenna System (DAS) will also provide reliable cellular coverage in places that are typically dark spots, like elevators and parking garages. The building will also feature Rogers Smart Community powered by 1Valet, which includes digital keys for suite and building entry, smart locks and thermostats, facial recognition systems, and guest verification through video calling.

Spanning 67-storeys, M4’s architecture is defined by four slender, smaller towers that terminate at different heights in the sky.

M4 will also feature various indoor and outdoor amenity spaces, including a hotel-style lobby, a Zen-inspired Nakaniwa Garden, intimate dining areas, barbecue stations, kids’ playgrounds and playrooms, a saltwater pool, outdoor daybeds, a party room, and a fully-equipped fitness centre.

Tower Five - M5 
M5 launched in 2022. The 36-storey, 430 suite tower is smaller in scale relative to the other towers in the M City community. M5’s architecture features two connected staggered towers.

The building’s amenity program and interior design focus on well-being, prioritizing a connection to nature and the outdoors throughout indoor spaces. This includes an outdoor plunge pool, meditation rooms, a Hammam steam bath, infrared saunas, a massage room, and a Zen lounge.

The Park

M Park 
The M City community will feature over 2 acres of new parkland and a connection to the Mary Fix Trail and “Bud” Cleary Park.

Public Art 
In 2021, Rogers Real Estate Development and Urban Capital announced plans for a $500,000 contribution towards public art in Mississauga to be made by Rogers. Working with the City of Mississauga’s Culture Division, as well as the Parks, Forestry and Environment Division, the funds will be used to commission new artwork to animate the public realm at M City.

References

Proposed skyscrapers in Canada
Condominiums in Canada
Buildings and structures in Mississauga